Theta Coronae Australis (Theta CrA), Latinized from θ Coronae Australis, is a solitary yellow-hued star located in the southernconstellation Corona Australis. It has an apparent magnitude of 4.61, making it readily visible to the naked eye. At its current distance, Theta CrA's brightness is diminished by three-tenths of a magnitudes due to interstellar dust. It has an absolute magnitude of −1.54.

This is an evolved red giant with a stellar classification of G8 III. It has 4.45 times the mass of the Sun but has expanded to 29.1 times the solar radius. One possible reason for this is because the star may have infrared excess suggesting the presence of a circumstellar disk.

References 

G-type giants
Corona Australis
Corona Australis, Theta
Durchmusterung objects
170845
090982
6951